Falna is an Indian Bengali romantic drama magical television series which is premiered on 1 March 2021 on Bengali General Entertainment Channel Star Jalsha, and is also available on the digital platform Disney+ Hotstar. The show is produced by Raj Chakraborty and Shyam Agarwal under the banner of Raj Srijan Arts LLP. It stars Debojyoti Roy Chowdhury, Roshni Tanwi Bhattacharya and Hiya Dey in lead roles. The show went off-air on 13 March 2022, due to low TRPs.

Synopsis
Falna shows the journey of a little street child named Falna. She is a gifted magician and singer. Her mission is to find her mother and pursue her dream of becoming a well-known performer.The story revolves around Beni, who always aspired to become a magician like her father but is ridiculed for her ambition. Her father marries her off to a wealthy man from an orthodox family. The circumstances prevent her from pursuing her dream and she is forced to carry out her family duties and responsibilities. A godman she meets by chance, tells her that her daughter will get to fulfill her dreams. She gets concerned as she has a boy child. A twist in fate leads her to a young street magician named Falna, who reminds her of the dream she once nurtured. Who is Falna? Why does Beni feel strangely drawn towards her?

Cast

Main

Hiya Dey as Khela Banerjee / Falna - Beni and Manish's lost daughter, Anita's adoptive daughter, Beni's disciple
 Meghan Chakraborty as first Falna before Replacement
Roshni Tanwi Bhattacharya as Shruti Banerjee (née Sarkar) aka Beni - Falna's mother, Rohan's adoptive mother, Manish's wife
Debojyoti Roy Chowdhury as Manish Banerjee - Falna's father, Rohan's adoptive father

Recurring
Sumanta Mukherjee as Shibotosh Banerjee - Manish's father, a businessman
Laboni Sarkar as Ashalata Banerjee aka Asha - Manish's mother
Tamhagna Manna / Ayush Roy as Rohan - Beni's adoptive son, Anita's son
Tanishka Tiwari as Tuktuki aka Rini : Fake Falna
Reshmi Sen as Tarulata aka Taru - Manish's maternal aunt
Soptorshi Roy as Prakash Sarkar - a magician, Beni's father
Pushpita Mukherjee as Banani Sarkar - Beni's mother
Gulshanara Khatun as Briospoti-Anita's neighborhood sister
Chanda Chattopadhyay as Briospoti's mother-in-law
Asmita Chakraborty as Tia - Manish's cousin
Tanusree Goswami as Purvi Banerjee - Manish's younger paternal aunt
Amlan Mazumder  as Monotosh Banerjee- Purvi's husband,Rono's father,Shibotosh's younger brother
Srishti Pandey as Tupur Banerjee - Manish's sister
Kuyasha Biswas as Anita - Rohan's mother, Falna's adoptive mother
Sudip Sarkar as Montu, Anita's husband
Sucharita Mukherjee as Tuktuki's stepmother.
Shamik Chakraborty as Ronodip Banerjee- Purvi's son
Paromita Daw as Nayanika Banerjee - Rono's wife
Manosi Das as Lali Banerjee - Rono and Nayanika's daughter
Archika Gupta as Neha-Tintin's Lover
Rupsa Chatterjee as Moon- Manish's fiancé, Avinash's ex-wife
Chaitali Chakraborty as Swagata-Ashalata's friend, Moon's Mother
Rumpa Chatterjee as Dola- Nayanika's mother and Lali's grandmother
Sanghasri Sinha Mitra as Moonmoon- Nayanika's Aunt
Krishna Roy as Dakshina - a maid
 Arijita Mukhopadhyay as Shoshikola- Khela's Orphanage's Aunt

Guest appearance
Raj Chakraborty

References

External links 

 Falna on Disney+ Hotstar

Indian drama television series
2021 Indian television series debuts
2022 Indian television series endings
Star Jalsha original programming
Bengali-language television programming in India